is an autobahn in Germany. It leads from the A 61 through Bad Neuenahr and ends behind Bad Neuenahr at a provisional connection. The extension to Linz am Rhein with a bridge is planned, but will be realized as the Bundesstraße 266.

The A 573 was originally planned as the southern end of the A 31.

Exit list 

  

|}

External links 

573
A573